The 2003 Nigerian Senate election in Plateau State was held on April 12, 2003, to elect members of the Nigerian Senate to represent Plateau State. Cosmas Niagwan representing Plateau South and Ibrahim Mantu representing Plateau Central won on the platform of Peoples Democratic Party, while Timothy Adudu representing Plateau North won on the platform of the All Nigeria Peoples Party.

Overview

Summary

Results

Plateau South 
The election was won by Cosmas Niagwan of the Peoples Democratic Party.

Plateau Central 
The election was won by Ibrahim Mantu of the Peoples Democratic Party.

Plateau North 
The election was won by Timothy Adudu of the All Nigeria Peoples Party.

References 

April 2003 events in Nigeria
Plateau State Senate elections
Pla